Loesser is a surname. Notable people with the surname include:

Arthur Loesser (1894–1969), American classical pianist and writer
Frank Loesser (1910–1969), American songwriter
Jo Sullivan Loesser (1927–2019), American actress and singer

See also
Lesser